Hayata  may refer to:
 Hayata, Afghanistan, a village in Balkh Province
Hayata (早田) is also a Japanese surname. It may refer to:
 Bunzō Hayata (1874–1934),  a Japanese botanist
, Japanese table tennis player
 Takuji Hayata (born in 1940), a Japanese gymnast and Olympic champion
 Yūji Hayata (1916–1995), a renowned Japanese photographer

 Fictional characters with the name Hayata (早田)
 Shin Hayata, the main character in the Japanese television series Ultraman.

Hayata (隼田) is also a Japanese surname. It may refer to:
 Yohei Hayata (born 1987), a Japanese professional wrestler

Orchids
Hayata, a genus of orchids

Hayata (隼太) is also a Japanese first name. It may refer to:
 Hayata Ito (1989), a Japanese baseball player
 Hayata Komatsu (1997), Japanese football player

Japanese-language surnames
Japanese masculine given names